Touch Me is the debut studio album by English singer Samantha Fox, released on 7 July 1986 by Jive Records. A successful topless model, Fox won a five-album contract with Jive after being invited to an open cattle call by the label, who were seeking "a British Madonna" to front the track "Touch Me (I Want Your Body)".

That single reached number three on the UK Singles Chart and number four on the US Billboard Hot 100. Following that success, the album was recorded quickly, with Fox spending a month recording "day and night" to meet deadlines. 

Fox pushed for a hard rock edge to the record, in accordance with her personal taste at the time. The album spawned three more commercially successful singles:, "Do Ya Do Ya (Wanna Please Me)", "Hold On Tight" and "I'm All You Need". 

The album has been certified silver by the British Phonographic Industry (BPI) and gold by the Recording Industry Association of America (RIAA). Derek Ridgers was credited for the cover photography.

On 25 July 2012, Cherry Red Records released a special two-disc deluxe reissue of Touch Me. Compiled with personal input from Fox, the set includes an extensive booklet, reversible cover art, newly added photos, a fully illustrated discography and recording data, full lyrics and new sleeve notes written especially for the release.

Critical reception

From contemporary reviews, Sylvie Simmons of Kerrang! declared the album to be "a bit of a mix" noting "different styles, different producers, 99% of both embarrassing" concluding that "there certainly isn't much passion on this album—better than I expected, if worse than I hoped."

Track listing

European and Australian edition

US, Canadian and Japanese edition

Special edition
Released on vinyl and cassette in select European countries (United Kingdom, Germany, Greece and Scandinavia) in 1986.

Notes
  signifies a remixer

Charts

Weekly charts

Year-end charts

Certifications

References

External links
 

1986 debut albums
Jive Records albums
Samantha Fox albums